is a women's association football club which plays in Japan's Nadeshiko League.

Players

Current squad

Results

See also
Japan Football Association

References

External links

Women's football clubs in Japan